Durham County was one of the original Nineteen Counties in New South Wales and is now one of the 141 Cadastral divisions of New South Wales. It is bordered on the south and west by the Hunter River, and on the north and east by the Williams River. It includes Aberdeen and Muswellbrook. Before 1834, the area known as Durham County included what later became Gloucester and most of Brisbane counties, as far west as the Liverpool Range, and east to the Pacific, including Port Stephens, as shown on an 1832 map.

Durham County was named in honour of John George Lambton, First Earl of Durham (1792-1840).

Parishes within this county
A full list of parishes found within this county; their current LGA and mapping coordinates to the approximate centre of each location is as follows:

References

External links
 Caergwrle, Allynbrook

Counties of New South Wales